At the 1920 Summer Olympics, ten wrestling events were contested, for all men. There were five weight classes in Greco-Roman wrestling and five classes in Catch as Catch Can, predecessor to freestyle wrestling. The competitions were held from Monday, August 16 to Friday, August 20, 1920 (Greco-Roman) and from Wednesday, August 25 to Friday, August 27, 1920 (freestyle).

Medal summary

Greco-Roman

Freestyle

Participating nations
A total of 152 wrestlers from 19 nations competed at the Antwerp Games:

Medal table

See also
 List of World and Olympic Champions in men's freestyle wrestling
 List of World and Olympic Champions in Greco-Roman wrestling

References

External links
International Olympic Committee results database
 

 
1920 Summer Olympics events
1920